is a man-made island in Higashinada-ku, Kobe, Hyōgo, Japan. It is located in the southeast region of the Port of Kobe. The residential area of the island, featuring apartment buildings—many with views of the sea—and single family homes, is located in the center of the island. A green belt separates the residential area from industrial and port activities. The two international schools located on the island attract many foreign residents to the island.

Creation
Kobe is a long and narrow city wedged between the coast to the south and the Rokkō Mountains to the north. As Kobe's population grew, there was no more space to expand. Kobe's situation was a microcosm of the situation faced by the entire island nation. Japan has an abundance of dense forests and a shortage of livable land. Urban planners in Kobe came up with an ingenious way to solve this problem: move mountains to create new land.

Workers sliced off the tops of some of the heavily wooded local mountains to the northwest of the city. A ten-mile long underground conveyor belt was created to take the reclaimed land to its new home in the sea. A conveyor carried the rock and earth to barges, which dumped the contents two miles out into the bay. The massive undertaking took almost twenty years, from 1973 until 1992, to construct. The  island is shaped like a rectangle.

Rokkō Island is not the first island that Kobe city planners had built. Port Island was completed a decade before Rokkō Island. In 1173, Taira no Kiyomori, a military leader of the late Heian period of Japan, built an island known as Kyogashima.

Access 

There are two main forms of public transportation to the island. The Rokko Liner, an automated guideway transit system, runs on an elevated viaduct through the central axis of the island and connects to the mainland. The Rokkō Liner stops at three stations on the island: Marine Park, Island Center, and Island Kita-Guchi. It connects Rokkō Island to Minami Uozaki, Uozaki Station on the Hanshin Line and Sumiyoshi Station on the JR Kobe Line. The Kobe Minato Kanko Bus is another option.

The Harbor Highway is a toll road which links in Sannomiya and Port Island from Rokko Island. The Hanshin Expressway Route 5 Wangan Route heads to Osaka. Limousine buses depart from the Kobe Bay Sheraton Hotel to Kansai Airport or to Universal Studios Japan. Ferry boats (Hankyu Ferry and Ferry Sunflower) leave the island every day for Kyushu and Shikoku.

Economy 
The major business on the island is related to the Kobe-Osaka International Port Corporation which operated both port container terminals, port liner berths and port ferry terminals. Several manufacturing companies also operate on the island including the chocolatier, Morozoff Ltd. The Asia One Center used to house the P&G Japan Head Office. Rokkō Island also features businesses catering to the local residents and tourists including two hotels, shopping, and restaurants.

Education

Universities 
Kobe International University

Public schools 

All are operated by Kobe municipality:

Kōyō Junior High School (神戸市立向洋中学校) - Covers all chome in all three districts in Rokko Island
Rokkō Island Elementary School (神戸市立六甲アイランド小学校)
  and  1-4 and 9-chome
Kōyō Elementary School (神戸市立向洋小学校)
  and Koyochonaka 5-8-chome

International schools 
Canadian Academy
Deutsche Schule Kobe/European School

Culture and recreation

Sports and leisure 
At Marine Park, there are views of a row of palm trees and the Pacific Ocean. The River Mall is an artificial river about one kilometer long that flows through the center of the island. In the summer, many children play in the wading pool. There are also several playgrounds on the island.

There is a community fitness center with exercise equipment, classes, and an indoor lap pool. Residents can play tennis or take lessons. There is an indoor skateboarding park. There are also several places to play futsal. A waterpark opens during the summer.

Museums 
Two museums are located on Rokkō Island. Kobe City Koiso Memorial Museum of Art is a small museum that commemorates the works of Kobe botanical artist Ryohei Koiso. The museum features a replica of his art studio, an art library, and three exhibition rooms.

The island is also home to the Kobe Fashion Museum, located in a futuristic-looking building, with exhibits on the history of fashion, seasonal exhibitions, and a library.

Events on the island 
Christmas caroling and a farmer's market are just two of the events held throughout the year for island residents and visitors to enjoy. People of various nationalities dance bon odori together during the RIC Summer Evening Carnival. The Rokkō Island Halloween and Harvest Festival is an annual event featuring a costume parade, costume contest, pumpkin carving, a haunted house, live shows, and trick-or-treating.

References

Geography of Kobe
Artificial islands of Kobe
Artificial islands of Japan
Islands of Hyōgo Prefecture